Élodie Ouédraogo (born 27 February 1981 in Saint-Josse-ten-Noode) is a retired Belgian sprinter of Burkinabé descent, who specializes in the 200 metres and 400 m hurdles. An Olympic gold medalist, her personal best time in the 200 m is 23.11 seconds, achieved in July 2004 in Brussels, while her personal best in the 400 m hurdles is 55.20, achieved at the 2012 Summer Olympics.
Ouédraogo is also the joint third-fastest Belgian woman after Kim Gevaert and Olivia Borlée and equalling Nancy Callaerts with her best 100 metres time of 11.40. Her 200 metres best ranks her fourth amongst Belgian women after Gevaert, Borlée and Hanna Mariën. Her 400 m hurdles best places her as the second-fastest Belgian woman over the distance, after Ann Mercken.

Athletic career
In Ouédraogo's early career she concentrated on the 100 m hurdles, and participated in the 2000 World Junior Championships. She set a national record of 13.87 seconds for Burkina Faso, the country she represented until 2000. Her personal best time while competing for Belgium is 13.34 seconds, achieved in August 2003 in Jambes. Her Burkinabé national record was surpassed by Béatrice Kamboulé in 2007.

Ouédraogo finished sixth in the 4 x 100 metres relay at the 2004 Summer Olympics with teammates Katleen De Caluwé, Lien Huyghebaert and Kim Gevaert. Ouédraogo also won the bronze medal at the 2005 Summer Universiade. At the 2007 World Championships she won a bronze medal in the 4x100 m relay with teammates Olivia Borlée, Hanna Mariën and Kim Gevaert, setting another national record.

Ouédraogo represented Belgium at the 2008 Summer Olympics in Beijing. She competed at the 4 x 100 m relay together with Gevaert, Mariën and Borlée. In their first-round heat they placed first in front of Great Britain, Brazil and Nigeria. Their time of 42.92 seconds was the third time overall out of sixteen participating nations. In the finals they finished in second place behind Russia in a national record time of 42.54 seconds, though after re-testing samples in 2016, Yuliya Chermoshanskaya's tests revealed two illegal substances.  The Russian team was disqualified for doping, and the Belgian's team silver medal was upgraded to a gold medal.

She qualified for the semi-finals of the 400 m hurdles at the 2012 Summer Olympics.

Miscellaneous
Ouédraogo retired from athletics in 2012 with the Memorial Van Damme as her last event. She is married to cartoon artist Jeroom.

References

External links
 
 Élodie Ouédraogo at All-Athletics.com
 

1981 births
Living people
People from Saint-Josse-ten-Noode
Burkinabé female sprinters
Burkinabé female hurdlers
Belgian female sprinters
Belgian female hurdlers
Olympic athletes of Belgium
Athletes (track and field) at the 2004 Summer Olympics
Athletes (track and field) at the 2008 Summer Olympics
Athletes (track and field) at the 2012 Summer Olympics
Olympic gold medalists for Belgium
Belgian people of Burkinabé descent
Sportspeople of Burkinabé descent
World Athletics Championships athletes for Belgium
World Athletics Championships medalists
Medalists at the 2008 Summer Olympics
Olympic gold medalists in athletics (track and field)
Universiade medalists in athletics (track and field)
Universiade bronze medalists for Belgium
Black Belgian sportspeople
Medalists at the 2005 Summer Universiade
Sportspeople from Brussels